William Birch, Bill Birch or Billy Birch may refer to:

 Bill Birch (born 1934), New Zealand politician
 Bill Birch (footballer) (born 20 October 1944), English/Australian footballer and coach
 Billy Birch (1831–1897), American minstrel performer
 William Birch (Australian cricketer) (1849–1897), Australian cricketer
 William Birch (English cricketer) (1863–1940), English cricketer
 William Birch (footballer) (1887–1968), English footballer
 William Birch (painter) (1755–1834), English and US miniature painter, enameler and engraver
 William Birch (settler) (1842–1920), English settler in North Island, New Zealand
 William Fred Birch (1870–1946), American politician
 William John Birch (1811–1891), English freethinker